The 1974 NAIA World Series was the 18th annual tournament hosted by the National Association of Intercollegiate Athletics to determine the national champion of baseball among its member colleges and universities in the United States and Canada.

After a four year absence, the tournament returned to Phil Welch Stadium in St. Joseph, Missouri.

Lewis (IL) (45-14) defeated Sam Houston State (42-11) in the single-game championship series, 3–2, to win the Flyers' first NAIA World Series.

Lewis pitcher, and future major leaguer, Tom Brennan was named tournament MVP.

Bracket

See also
 1974 NCAA Division I baseball tournament
 1974 NCAA Division II baseball tournament

Reference

NAIA World Series
NAIA World Series
NAIA World Series